This is the electoral history of Barack Obama. Obama served as the 44th president of the United States (2009–2017) and as a United States senator from Illinois (2005–2008).

A member of the Democratic Party, Obama was first elected to the Illinois Senate in 1996 representing the 13th district, which covered much of the Chicago South Side. In 2000, Obama ran an unsuccessful campaign for Illinois's 1st congressional district against four-term incumbent Bobby Rush. In 2004, Obama campaigned for the U.S. Senate, participating in the first Senate election in which both major party candidates were African American, the other being Alan Keyes. Obama won the election, gaining a seat previously held by a Republican.

In 2008, Obama entered the Democratic primaries for the U.S. presidential election. Numerous candidates entered initially, but over time the field narrowed down to Obama and Senator Hillary Clinton from New York. The contest was highly competitive between the two, with neither being able to reach a majority of delegates without the addition of unpledged delegates. Eventually, Clinton ended her campaign, endorsing Obama for the nomination, prompting his victory. He went on to face Senator John McCain from Arizona as the Republican nominee, defeating him with 365 electoral votes to McCain's 173.

Obama sought re-election for a second term in 2012, running virtually unopposed in the Democratic primaries. His opponent in the general election was former governor of Massachusetts Mitt Romney. Obama won 332 electoral votes, defeating Romney who gained 206. After this election, he became the first president since Ronald Reagan to receive a majority of the popular vote twice.

Illinois Senate elections (1996–2002)

1996

1998

2002

United States House of Representatives election (2000)

Primary election

United States Senate election (2004)

Primary election

General election

Presidential primary (2008)

Popular vote

Excluding penalized contests, only primary and caucuses votes:

Including penalized contests:

Delegate counts

2008 Democratic National Convention (Presidential tally)
 Barack Obama - chosen by acclamation

Unfinished roll call (13 states, D.C. Guam, American Samoa and Democrats Abroad):
 Hillary Clinton - 1,011 (24.07%)

Other results

Presidential elections (2008–2012)

2008

2012

See also 

 Obama coalition
 Electoral history of Joe Biden
 Electoral history of Hillary Clinton
 Electoral history of Sarah Palin
 Electoral history of John McCain
 Electoral history of John Edwards
 Electoral history of Kamala Harris

References

Barack Obama
Obama, Barack
Obama, Barack